Anshula Kant (born 7 September 1960) is the chief financial officer and managing director of the World Bank Group, appointed on 12 July 2019. She is from Roorkee, India.

Education 
In 1981, Kant completed her masters' in Economics from Delhi School of Economics and her bachelors' in Economics from Lady Sri Ram College for Women in 1979, both of Delhi University. At the Indian Institute of Bankers, she is a Certified Associate.

Career 

In 1983, Kant joined the State Bank of India (SBI) as a probationary officer. She became the chief general manager of SBI (Maharashtra and Goa), deputy managing director of operations for National Banking Group, and chief executive officer of SBI (Singapore). In September 2018, she became the managing director of SBI for a period of two years, and a member of the bank's board. 

On 12 July 2019, she was appointed as the chief financial officer and managing director of the World Bank Group, and will be responsible for the balance sheet and financial and risk management.

On January 26 2023, it was announced that Kant will lead, alongside World Bank Managing Director of Operations Axel van Trotsenburg, the Evolution Roadmap exercise aimed at exploring how the World Bank Group can better respond to the need for increased action to address the growing crisis of poverty and economic distress, and global challenges, including climate change, pandemic risks, and rising fragility and conflict.

Personal life 
Kant is married to Sanjay Kant, a chartered accountant from Varanasi, Uttar Pradesh. She has a son, Siddharth, and a daughter, Nupur.

References 

1960 births
21st-century Indian businesswomen
21st-century Indian businesspeople
Delhi School of Economics alumni
Indian women bankers
Living people
People from East Singhbhum district
People from Jamshedpur
State Bank of India
World Bank Group
World Bank Group people